Junípero Serra, or Father Junipero Serra, is a bronze sculpture depicting the Roman Catholic Spanish priest and friar Junípero Serra by Ettore Cadorin.

One statue is installed in the United States Capitol's National Statuary Hall, in Washington, D.C., as part of the National Statuary Hall Collection. It was donated by the U.S. state of California in 1931.

Another bronze statue was installed in Los Angeles in 1934.

See also
 1931 in art
 List of public art in Los Angeles
 Statue of Junípero Serra (disambiguation)

References

External links
 

1931 establishments in Washington, D.C.
1931 sculptures
Bronze sculptures in California
Bronze sculptures in Washington, D.C.
Statues of Junípero Serra
Serra
Outdoor sculptures in Greater Los Angeles
Sculptures of men in California
Sculptures of men in Washington, D.C.
Statues in California